Peter Åland Topley (born 29 August 1950) is a former English cricketer.  Topley was a right-handed batsman who bowled slow left-arm orthodox. He was born at Canterbury, Kent.

Topley made his first-class debut for Kent against Warwickshire at Hesketh Park, Dartford, in the 1972 County Championship.  He made seventeen further first-class appearances for the county, the last of which came against Middlesex in the 1975 County Championship.  In his eighteen first-class appearances for Kent, he scored a total of 150 runs at an average of 10.71, with a high score of 38 not out.  With the ball, he took 14 wickets at a bowling average of 47.78, with best figures of 2/28.  Topley also made a single first-class appearance in 1973 for the Marylebone Cricket Club against Kent, scoring 34 runs and taking a single wicket.  In addition to playing first-class cricket, Topley also made three List A appearances for Kent, against Glamorgan in 1972, Derbyshire in 1973, and Worcestershire in 1975.

His brother, Don, and nephew, Reece Topley, have both played first-class cricket.

Since retiring from cricket Topley has worked as a driving instructor in Canterbury.

References

External links

1950 births
Living people
Sportspeople from Canterbury
English cricketers
Kent cricketers
Marylebone Cricket Club cricketers